Michael John Soong (born 6 February 1980) is a Hong Kong racing driver previously competing in the China Touring Car Championship. He is a former World Touring Car Championship driver, who made his debut in 2013.

Racing career
Soong began his career in 2004 in the Hong Kong Touring Car Championship. In 2007 he switched to the China Touring Car Championship. In 2013 Soong made his World Touring Car Championship debut with Campos Racing driving a SEAT León WTCC in the last round in Macau. In October 2014 it was announced that he would race in the Chinese round in Beijing, again driving for Campos Racing.

Racing record

Complete World Touring Car Championship results
(key) (Races in bold indicate pole position – 1 point awarded just in first race; races in italics indicate fastest lap – 1 point awarded all races; * signifies that driver led race for at least one lap – 1 point given all races)

References

External links
 

1980 births
Living people
World Touring Car Championship drivers
Hong Kong racing drivers
Campos Racing drivers
Engstler Motorsport drivers